James Brackenridge Clemens (31 January 1825, in Wheeling, West Virginia – 11 January 1867, in Easton, Pennsylvania) was an American entomologist who specialized in Lepidoptera. He described many new species. His collection of microlepidoptera is in the Academy of Natural Sciences of Philadelphia.

Works
1859 "Synopsis of the North American Sphingides" Journal of the Academy of Natural Sciences Philadelphia 4 (2): 97-190
1859-1861 "Contributions to American Lepidopterology 1-7" Proceedings of the Entomological Society of Philadelphia
1863 "American Micro-Lepidoptera" Proceedings of the Entomological Society of Philadelphia 2(1):4–14.
1864 "North American Microlepidoptera" Proceedings of the Entomological Society of Philadelphia 2: 415–430.
1872 The Tineina of North America. Ed. H.T. Stainton. London, J. Van Voorst, 1872.

References
"Clemens, James Brackenridge". Biographies of the Entomologists of the World. Naturmuseum Senckenberg. Retrieved November 4, 2017.

American lepidopterists
1825 births
1867 deaths
People from Wheeling, West Virginia
19th-century American zoologists